The Orchestre Français des Jeunes (French Youth Orchestra, OFJ) is the national youth orchestra of France, founded in 1982 by the Ministry of Culture. It consists of young musicians of ages 16 to 25, selected by audition.

In 2013, to mark the 50th anniversary of the Élysée Treaty, the Orchestre Français des Jeunes performed a series of concerts together with its German counterpart, the Bundesjugendorchester, under the direction of Dennis Russell Davies.

It is a member of the European Federation of National Youth Orchestras.

List of musical directors 

 1982-1983: Jérôme Kaltenbach
 1984-1985: Emmanuel Krivine
 1986: Sylvain Cambreling
 1987-1991: Emmanuel Krivine
 1992-1998: Marek Janowski
 1998-2001: Jesus Lopez Cobos
 2001-2004: Emmanuel Krivine
 2004: Jesus Lopez Cobos
 2005-2008: Jean-Claude Casadesus
 2008: Dennis Russell Davies
 2009-2010: Kwamé Ryan
 2011-2014: Dennis Russell Davies
 2015-2016: David Zinman
 since 2017: Fabien Gabel

See also 
 List of youth orchestras

References 

Music education organizations
National youth orchestras
French orchestras
European youth orchestras
Musical groups established in 1982